Northwestern University Pritzker School of Law is the law school of Northwestern University, a private research university. It is located on the university's Chicago campus.  Northwestern Law has been ranked among the top 14, or "T14" law schools, since U.S. News & World Report began publishing its annual rankings. Northwestern Law is among the top ten most selective law schools. Its performance in the job market has also contributed to its prestige.

Founded in 1859, it was the first law school established in Chicago. Notable alumni include numerous governors of several states; Arthur Goldberg, United States Supreme Court justice; Adlai Stevenson, governor of Illinois, cabinet secretary, and Democratic presidential candidate; John Paul Stevens, United States Supreme Court justice; Newton Minow, former chairman of the FCC; and Harold Washington, the first black Mayor of Chicago (1983–87) and, previously, a member of the U.S. House of Representatives.

History
Founded in 1859, the school that would become known as the Northwestern University Pritzker School of Law was the first law school established in the city of Chicago. The school was originally the law department of the Old University of Chicago under the founding direction of Henry Booth and enrolled twenty-three students. The law school became Union College of Law when it jointly affiliated with Northwestern University in 1873. In 1891, the law school formally became Northwestern University School of Law when Northwestern assumed total control. Throughout the 20th century, programs such as the JD-MBA and JD-PhD were added to maintain the law school's position as one of America's top-ranked schools of law. In October 2015, it was renamed Northwestern University Pritzker School of Law after J.B. Pritzker and his wife, M.K. Pritzker, who gave $100 million to the law school.

Campus

Northwestern Law is located on Northwestern University's downtown campus in Chicago's Streeterville/Gold Coast neighborhood. The law school is on Lake Shore Drive and Chicago Avenue, adjacent to Lake Shore Park and Lake Michigan, and a few blocks from the John Hancock Center, Magnificent Mile, Water Tower, Oak Street Beach, and Navy Pier.

The law school's location in the heart of downtown Chicago provides a wealth of part-time employment options for students while in school and a setting in which to study law. The proximity to courts, commerce, and public interest activities enables students to experience the practice of law, as well as its theory.

Admissions
Admission to Northwestern Law is extremely selective. For the class entering in the fall of 2021, 1,031 out of 7,410 (13.9%) were offered admission, with 234 matriculating. The 25th and 75th LSAT percentiles for the 2021 entering class were 167 and 172, respectively, with a median of 171. The 25th and 75th undergraduate GPA percentiles were 3.60 and 3.93, respectively, with a median of 3.86.

The law school's practical philosophy is manifested in a strong preference for applicants with at least two years of work experience.  Approximately 90% of the school's students enter with at least one year of full-time work experience; 70% possess more than two years of experience.

Employment 
According to U.S. News & World Report's 2017 Edition, 79% of the law school's 2016 graduates obtained prospective, full-time employment prior to graduation, with a median starting salary of $180,000.  According to Northwestern's official 2016 ABA-required disclosures, 91% of the Class of 2015 obtained full-time, long-term employment nine months after graduation. Northwestern's Law School Transparency under-employment score is 4.4%, indicating the percentage of the Class of 2018 unemployed, pursuing an additional degree, or working in a non-professional, short-term, or part-time job nine months after graduation.

Northwestern Law is well-established among BigLaw firms (defined as firms with 150 or more associates). In Vault's 2016 survey, of over 15,000 BigLaw associates, Northwestern Law ranked #2 as a "feeder" school for BigLaw firms, after accounting for school size. According to Vault, Northwestern Law outperforms its expected BigLaw representation by 315%.

The law school enrolls approximately 985 students in its J.D., LL.M., S.J.D. and M.S.L. (Master of Science in Law) programs. The school employs an interdisciplinary research faculty, and has a low student-faculty ratio. According to Northwestern's 2016 ABA-required disclosures, 93% of the Class of 2016 obtained full-time, long-term employment nine months after graduation.

Costs
The total cost of attendance (indicating the cost of tuition, fees, living expenses, books, and other miscellaneous expenses) at Northwestern Law for the 2015-2016 academic year is $79,904. The Law School Transparency estimated debt-financed cost of attendance for three years is $292,586.

Journals
Northwestern Law sponsors six student-run scholarly legal journals.  Student staff members are selected based on a writing competition, editing competition, and first-year grades, or a publishable note or comment on a legal topic.

Northwestern Journal of International Law & Business
The Journal of International Law and Business has a substantive focus on private international law, as opposed to public international law or human rights. It seeks scholarship analyzing transnational and international legal problems and their effect on private entities.  The Journal's stated goal is to promote an understanding of the future course of international legal developments as they relate to private entities.

Northwestern University Law Review

The Northwestern University Law Review was first published in 1906 when it was called the "Illinois Law Review."  Prior editors include: Roscoe Pound, long-time dean of Harvard Law School; Judge Robert A. Sprecher of the United States Court of Appeals for the Seventh Circuit; US Supreme Court Justice John Paul Stevens; Dean James A. Rahl; Illinois Governor Daniel Walker; and former chairman of the Federal Communications Commission Newton N. Minow; US Supreme Court Justice Arthur Goldberg and Presidential Candidate Adlai Stevenson.

Northwestern Journal of Technology and Intellectual Property
The Northwestern Journal of Technology and Intellectual Property addresses subjects relating to law at the intersection of technology and intellectual property, including law and biotechnology, copyrights, the Internet, media, patents, telecommunications, and trademarks.

Journal of Criminal Law and Criminology

The School states that its Journal of Criminal Law and Criminology "is one of the most widely read and widely cited publications in the world". It is the second most widely subscribed journal published by any law school in the country.  It is one of the most widely circulated law journals in the country. The journal was founded in 1910 by Dean John Henry Wigmore.

Journal of Law and Social Policy
The Journal of Law and Social Policy is an interdisciplinary journal that explores the impact of the law on different aspects of society. Topics covered include race, gender, sexual orientation, housing, immigration, health care, juvenile justice, voting rights, family law, civil rights, poverty, the environment, and privacy rights.

Journal of Human Rights
The Journal of Human Rights is an interdisciplinary journal dedicated to providing a dynamic forum for the discussion of human rights issues and law.  The Journal seeks contributions from professionals, scholars, and experienced field workers of every background, including but not limited to law, business, political science, public policy, economics, sociology, religion, and international relations.  In addition to publication, the Journal seeks to promote the discussion of human rights law by organizing semi-annual Symposia and a Speaker Series. The Journal of Human Rights was founded in 2003 as the Journal of International Human Rights, but adopted its present name in 2016 to better reflect its focus.

Pritzker Legal Research Center

The Pritzker Legal Research Center is the library, and fulfills the research and information needs of the faculty and students of Northwestern Law. The Center is named after the Pritzker family, a philanthropic Chicago family. Jay A. Pritzker (1922-1999) graduated from Northwestern University in 1941 and Northwestern University School of Law in 1947.

Bluhm Legal Clinic
Clinical education at Northwestern dates back to the law school's beginnings. An innovative program developed by Dean John Henry Wigmore in 1910 with the Chicago Legal Aid Society evolved into the Legal Clinic, which opened its doors in 1969 with only two staff attorneys. In 2000, the Clinic was named for Northwestern University trustee and alum Neil Bluhm. Today, the Bluhm Legal Clinic houses more than 20 clinics within 14 centers and is widely recognized as one of the most comprehensive and effective clinical programs in the country. Through the law school's clinical program, students gain direct experience representing clients and fine-tune their skills as advocates. They also work with clinical faculty and staff to challenge the fairness of our legal institutions and to propose solutions for reform. From 2000 to 2013, its director was Steven Drizin.

Center on Wrongful Convictions

The Center on Wrongful Convictions (CWC) is dedicated to identifying and rectifying wrongful convictions. The Center investigates possible wrongful convictions and represents imprisoned clients with claims of actual innocence. It also focuses on raising public awareness of the prevalence, causes, and social costs of wrongful convictions and promoting reform of the criminal justice system. Faculty member Prof Steven Drizin founded the sister project to this Center which is specifically aimed at juvenile convicts; Center on Wrongful Convictions of Youth.

Appellate Advocacy Center
Established in 2006, the Appellate Advocacy Center includes the Federal Appellate Clinic and the Supreme Court Clinic, along with a moot program for practitioners. The Appellate Advocacy Center is directed by Xiao Wang.

Federal Appellate Clinic

In the Federal Appellate Clinic, students research and brief cases in federal appellate courts across the country. In certain instances, where a case involves significant federal issues or interests, students will also participate in state appellate court work. Clinic cases generally focus on immigration, qualified immunity, and criminal sentencing and post-conviction issues, although other topics and matters are covered as well. Where possible,  Clinic students participate in oral argument before a United States court of appeals.

Supreme Court Clinic

In the Supreme Court Clinic, students work with attorneys at Sidley Austin to draft certiorari, merits, and amicus briefs before the Supreme Court. Sidley attorneys Carter Phillips and Jeffrey Green co-direct the Supreme Court Clinic.

The Clinic works on a variety of legal matters. During any given year, the Clinic will file briefs in cases concerning international law, tribal law, sentencing, criminal procedure, habeas, and the First Amendment. The Clinic frequently collaborates with state and federal public defenders. The Clinic also works with nonprofit organizations, including the National Association of Criminal Defense Lawyers. In fall 2021, the Clinic partnered with Northwestern's Center for International Human Rights, Amnesty International, Global Justice Center, and Human Rights Watch to file an amicus brief in Dobbs v. Jackson Women's Health Organization, asserting that Mississippi's abortion ban was inconsistent with international law.

Children and Family Justice Center
The Children and Family Justice Center represents young people on matters of delinquency and crime, family violence, school discipline, health and disability, and immigration and asylum. Attorneys, a social worker, and affiliated professionals help second- and third-year law students meet with clients, research legal issues, learn pretrial investigation, interviewing, and counseling skills, and litigate cases.

MacArthur Justice Center
The MacArthur Justice Center focuses its work on police misconduct, wrongful detention compensation, post-9/11 work, and other public interest and civil rights issues. Of particular note is the Guantanamo Bay detainee representation led by Joseph Margulies, author of Guantanamo and the Abuse of Presidential Power and lead counsel in Rasul v. Bush.

Donald Pritzker Entrepreneurship Law Center
The Donald Pritzker Entrepreneurship Law Center (DPELC), founded as the Small Business Opportunity Center (SBOC), is a transactional clinic that was founded in 1998. Clients include technology executives, consultants, inventors, manufacturers and sellers of consumer products, musical groups, and persons interested in establishing nonprofit organizations.

The Center is also heavily involved in teaching in the field of entrepreneurship law, and hosts symposia and conferences to facilitate that endeavor.

Center for International Human Rights
The Center for International Human Rights works to advance human rights while enabling students to test and refine their academic learning in real cases. Stressing a comprehensive interdisciplinary approach, the center provides policy perspectives to the United Nations, the Organization of American States, the U.S. Department of State, foreign governments, and nongovernmental organizations. Over the years faculty and staff working in the center have addressed, among other matters, the role of the International Criminal Court, international terrorism, U.S. death penalty laws, truth commissions, economic rights, NATO's humanitarian intervention, and political asylum cases. Students have investigated cases and had summer internships in Guatemala, Indonesia, and at the U.N. Human Rights Centre in Geneva.

The Center also offers students an opportunity to earn an LLM in Human Rights. The degree program is designed for students from transitional democracies and for those with career interests in international human rights law.

Investor Protection Center
The Investor Protection Center provides assistance to investors with limited income or small dollar claims who are unable to obtain legal representation. Law students, under the supervision of faculty attorneys, represent customers in handling their disputes with broker-dealers.

During the last few years, the (Financial Industry Regulatory Authority)(FINRA) and other organizations have taken steps to make more information and services available to investors. Northwestern Law's Investor Protection Center operates with the aid of grants from the FINRA Investor Education Foundation and other organizations to focus on priority areas. In particular, the Center is focused on helping to meet the needs of women, novice investors, and the elderly, in connection with securities arbitration.

Fred Bartlit Center for Trial Advocacy
Named in honor of an innovative leader in litigation and business strategies, the Fred Bartlit Center for Trial Advocacy was established in 1999 to conduct research and teach innovative and technologically advanced trial strategy. The Bartlit Center focuses on changes in trial craft brought on by new technologies and compensation approaches.

The Bartlit Center sponsors and conducts academic research on the litigation process; support teaching skills in the JD program; and holds national conferences to explore and teach innovative trial and trial management strategies. The Bartlit Center works to complement the law school's program in simulation-based teaching of trial skills and builds on the research produced by Northwestern Law faculty.

 Buildings gallery 

Rankings and honors

Notable faculty
The 2016 student/faculty ratio was 6.5 to 1.

Notable Northwestern Law faculty, past and present, include:

Ronald J. Allen, renowned evidence scholar and adviser to foreign governments on law reform
Steven Calabresi, constitutional scholar and founder and chairman of the Federalist Society
 Steven Drizin
 Edwin R. Keedy, dean of the University of Pennsylvania Law School 
Andrew Koppelman, noted legal scholar on same-sex marriage
Leon Green, former dean; renowned for pioneering work in the law of torts, especially causation and injuries to relations
Charles T. McCormick, expert on evidence, damages, and federal court procedure; writings include the classic hornbooks, Handbook on the Law of Damages (1935) and Handbook on the Law of Evidence (1954).
John O. McGinnis, renowned expert on trade law and one of nation's leading scholars in the field of Constitutional Law.
Dawn Clark Netsch, expert in governmental organization law and the first woman to be nominated by a major political party to run for Governor of Illinois.
James E. Pfander, renowned civil procedure, federal courts, and constitutional law scholar
Roscoe Pound, former dean of Harvard Law School, founder of the movement for "sociological jurisprudence"
Martin Redish, civil procedure and constitutional law scholar
David S. Ruder, former Chairman of the Securities and Exchange Commission
David Scheffer, international law and war crimes expert who served as the first United States Ambassador-at-Large for War Crimes Issues
Charles Taylor, internationally renowned political philosopher, Royal Society of Canada fellow, British Academy fellow, member of the American Academy of Arts & Sciences
David E. Van Zandt, former dean of Northwestern University School of Law
John Henry Wigmore, the "father of modern evidence," first full-time dean of Northwestern Law (1901) and author of Treatise on Evidence''

Popular media
The Chicago Code was substantially filmed on the Northwestern Law campus in Chicago. This television drama premiered on Fox on February 7, 2011.  Filming at Northwestern Law began in August 2010.  Classrooms in the law school are depicted as interior offices for the fictional offices for City administration.  Levy Mayer 212 served as the main taping location at the law school.
 In The Judge, Robert Downey Jr. plays the role of a Chicago defense attorney who is a Northwestern Law graduate.
 Prof Steven Drizin and Prof Laura Nirider feature heavily in the 2016 Netflix documentary Making a Murderer as the post-conviction legal representatives of Brendan Dassey. Dassey’s confession is thought by many to be false and coerced, so both Drizin and Nirider are acting as part of work by the Center on Wrongful Convictions of Youth.

Alumni

Selected prominent Northwestern Law alumni include:

Academia

For-profit / Non-profit organizations

Government and politics

Judiciary

Firsts
Mary Bartelme, first woman elected judge in Illinois.
Ferdinand L. Barnett, first African-American assistant State's Attorney in Illinois.
Salem J. Chalabi, first General Director of the Iraqi Special Tribunal to try Saddam Hussein
William Dawson, first African American to chair a congressional committee.
 Ada Kepley, first woman in the United States to graduate from a law school
Kenesaw Mountain Landis, first Commissioner of Major League Baseball, former U.S. District Judge for the United States District Court for the Northern District of Illinois
Dawn Clark Netsch, first woman to be elected to a statewide constitutional office in Illinois
Harold Washington, first African American Mayor of Chicago (1983–87), Member of the U.S. House of Representatives
Horace Ward, challenged racial discrimination at the University of Georgia, and first African American to become a federal judge in Georgia
Lloyd Garrison Wheeler, first African American admitted to the bar in Illinois.

References

External links

 
Northwestern University
Educational institutions established in 1859
1859 establishments in Illinois
Wrongful conviction advocacy
Law schools in Illinois
Streeterville, Chicago